Kafr al-Awamid or Kafr al-Awameed (Arabic: كفر العواميد) is a Syrian village in the Al-Zabadani District of the Rif Dimashq Governorate. According to the Syria Central Bureau of Statistics (CBS), Kafr al-Awamid had a population of 1,588 in the 2004 census.

References

External links

Populated places in Al-Zabadani District